"Two of Us" is a song by Australian alternative rock band Birds of Tokyo. It was released on 17 January 2020 as the fourth single from the band's sixth studio album, Human Design. The song was premiered on the band's Good Lord Tour.

The song was nominated for Most Performed Alternative Work and shortlisted for Song of the Year at the APRA Music Awards of 2021

Music video
The music video for "Two of Us" was released on 3 February 2020. Director Zac Lynch-Woodlock said "We all had a lot of fun making this clip. I've been friends with the guys for ages, and when Glenn and Berney approached me about collaborating on a music video, I was super keen. They had some nice references in mind including the idea of doing the video as a one-shot which always presents its own unique set of challenges, Finding an interesting location that would allow continuous movement along a road for the entire song being one of them." Lynch-Woodlock said "We wanted to show Kenny's journey as a road to redemption and the clip picks up from the bloodied and beaten Kenny in the 'Good Lord' music video. 'Two of Us' travels with a bandaged Kenny as he transitions with the help of some friends to a place of happiness."

Charts

Weekly charts

Year-end charts

Certifications

References

2019 songs
2020 singles
Birds of Tokyo songs
EMI Records singles